Maxfield Research is a Minnesota based real estate research company. The company specializes in obtaining and interpreting real estate market information and conducts feasibility studies for potential land development.

History
Founded in 1983 by Lee Maxfield and business partner Gary Solomonson, Maxfield Research has grown into a small team-based company of research analysts, interns, and an office manager. The headquarters are in Northeast, Minneapolis. The current President is Mary Bujold and Vice President is Jay Thompson.

Clients
Maxfield serves both the private sector and public sector. The majority of its clients include real estate developers, independent proprietors, and housing authorities. Besides many types of housing studies, the company also conducts demand research for office, retail, food, industrial, and recreational. 

In the Minneapolis-St. Paul metropolitan area, Maxfield is best known for evaluating condominium projects and senior housing. Due to regular publishing of real estate market reports, company researchers are frequently sourced and opined by local news.

Maxfield is an independent proprietary of the Griffin Companies.

References

External links
Real Estate Courses
Learn Real Estate Investing
Multiple Listing Services Information

Companies based in Minneapolis